Tap Tao is a village and tambon (subdistrict) of Thoeng District, in Chiang Rai Province, Thailand. In 2005 it had a population of 12,252 people. The tambon contains 26 villages.

References

Tambon of Chiang Rai province
Populated places in Chiang Rai province